Shane Sims (born April 30, 1988) is an American former professional ice hockey defenseman who briefly played in the National Hockey League (NHL) with the New York Islanders.

Playing career
Sims attended Ohio State University. Sims was drafted 126th overall by the New York Islanders in the 2006 NHL Entry Draft. On April 9, 2011 he signed a one-day NHL regular season amateur tryout agreement. On April 9, 2011, Sims made his NHL debut as he appeared in the final game of the 2010–2011 season against the Philadelphia Flyers.

After two seasons abroad in Denmark and Austria, with Aalborg Pirates and HC TWK Innsbruck respectively, Sims returned to North America as a free agent to sign a one-year contract with the Toledo Walleye of the ECHL on September 22, 2014.

On August 4, 2015, Sims returned to Europe in agreeing to a one-year contract to end his career with Italian club, HC Gherdëina of the Serie A.

Career statistics

Awards and honours

References

External links

1988 births
Living people
Aalborg Pirates players
American expatriate sportspeople in Austria
American expatriate sportspeople in Denmark
American men's ice hockey defensemen
Des Moines Buccaneers players
Gwinnett Gladiators players
HC TWK Innsbruck players
Ice hockey players from New York (state)
New York Islanders draft picks
New York Islanders players
Ohio State Buckeyes men's ice hockey players
People from East Amherst, New York
Toledo Walleye players